The 2012 SAP Open was a tennis tournament played on indoor hard courts. It was the 124th edition of the SAP Open, and was part of the ATP World Tour 250 series of the 2012 ATP World Tour. It took place at the HP Pavilion in San Jose, California, United States, from February 13 through February 19, 2012. Third-seeded Milos Raonic won the singles title.

Singles main draw entrants

Seeds 

1 Rankings as of February 6, 2012

Other entrants 
The following players received wildcards into the main draw:
  Robby Ginepri
  Steve Johnson
  Jack Sock

The following players received entry from the qualifying draw:
  Denis Kudla
  Dimitar Kutrovsky
  Dennis Lajola
  Tim Smyczek

Withdrawals
  Gaël Monfils (knee injury)

Doubles main draw entrants

Seeds

 Rankings are as of February 6, 2012

Other entrants
The following pairs received wildcards into the doubles main draw:
  Sam Querrey /  Jack Sock
  Robby Ginepri /  Travis Rettenmaier

Finals

Singles 

 Milos Raonic defeated  Denis Istomin, 7–6(7–3), 6–2
It was Raonic's 2nd title of the year and 3rd of his career. He successfully defended his title.

Doubles 

 Mark Knowles /  Xavier Malisse defeated  Kevin Anderson /  Frank Moser, 6–4, 1–6, [10–5]

References

External links 
Official website

 
SAP Open
SAP Open
SAP Open
SAP Open
SAP Open